Storforshei is a village in the Dunderland Valley in the municipality of Rana in Nordland county, Norway. The European route E06 and the Nordland Line both pass through the village.

References

Rana, Norway
Villages in Nordland